Run Come Save Me is the second studio album by English hip hop musician Roots Manuva. It was released on Big Dada in 2001.

Critical reception

John Bush of AllMusic wrote, "Roots Manuva handled every type of song with flowing confidence and a bemused air, whether it was a club jam or a message track." Alex Needham of NME called it "Brit-rap's finest hour to date." Christian Hopwood of BBC Music felt that the album "should be lauded for its degree of musical invention and individual approach to the genre".

Q listed it as one of the best 50 albums of 2001.

Track listing

Charts

Certifications

References

External links
 

2001 albums
Big Dada albums
Roots Manuva albums